EAAF may refer to:
East Asian–Australasian Flyway, a Pacific Rim bird migration flyway stretching from the southern coast of Alaska to the Taimyr Peninsula in Russia southward to encompass Australia and New Zealand
Equipo Argentino de Antropología Forense, the Argentine Forensic Anthropology Team
Egyptian Army Air Force, a precursor of the Egyptian Air Force